Jaraba is a municipality located in the province of Zaragoza, Aragon, Spain. According to the 2004 census (INE), the municipality has a population of 316 inhabitants.

This town is located in the deep Mesa River valley, at the feet of the Sierra de Solorio range, Sistema Ibérico. There are three spas in the municipality, two are located close to the river.

See also
Comunidad de Calatayud
List of municipalities in Zaragoza

References

External links

Hoces del Río Mesa - Tourism

Municipalities in the Province of Zaragoza